My Shirt Looks Good On You is the seventh album by Catie Curtis.

Critical reception

Liana Jonas of AllMusic writes that the album is, "a winning and driven folk-rock collection that explores love in Curtis' signature idealistic fashion."

Colin Berry of NPR says of the album, "It's great listening for both new and old fans."

Carol Harrison of Exclaim! concludes her review with, "This is slick, TV-ready, easy listening country for the Melissa Etheridge set."

Track listing

Musicians

Catie Curtis – Vocals, Guitar, Keyboards
Jimmy Ryan – Mandolin, Mandocello, Vocals
Dana Colley – Baritone Saxophone, Tenor Saxophone, Vocals (tracks 4, 6, 8)
Andrew Mazzone – Bass (tracks 1–5, 8, 12, 13)
Gail Ann Dorsey – Bass, Vocals (tracks 6, 7, 9-11), Drums (track 14)
Billy Beard – Drum [Cocktail] (tracks 1, 5, 8)
Billy Conway – Percussion (track 11), Drums (tracks 1-10, 12-14)
Duke Levine – Electric Guitar (tracks: 6, 7, 9, 13), Michael Eisenstein (track 7)
Kris Delmhorst – Harmony Vocals (track 3)
Julie Wolf – Organ, Vocals, Piano, Clavinet (tracks 2, 6–8, 10, 13)
Caoimhe O'Hara – Whistle (tracks 5, 14)

Production

Producer – Catie Curtis
Producer, Engineer, Center Spread Photography – Trina Shoemaker
Recorded by Matt Beaudoin
Recorded by Sue Kappa
Mastered by Greg Calbi
Mixed by Paul Conaway, Trina Shoemaker
A&R – George Howard
A&R Coordinator – Steve Ellis
Photography – Tracy Aiguier
Art Direction – Steven Jurgensmeyer

Track information and credits adapted from the album's liner notes.

References

External links
Artist Official Site

2001 albums